Prague 1, formally the Prague 1 Municipal District, is a second-tier municipality in Prague. It is co-extensive with the national administrative district (správní obvod) of the same name.

Prague 1 includes most of the medieval heart of the city. All of Staré Město (the Old Town) and Josefov (the Jewish Quarter) are in the district, as are most of Malá Strana (the Little Quarter), Hradčany and Nové Město (the New Town). Tiny parts of Holešovice and Vinohrady (the State Opera and new building of the National Museum) round out the district. The district has remained intact since its creation in 1960.

Most of Prague 1 is a UNESCO World Heritage Site. Almost all of Prague's major tourist sites, including Prague Castle, Old Town Square, the Charles Bridge and the above-mentioned Jewish Quarter, are in the district. The Parliament of the Czech Republic and the offices of the government are in Malá Strana, while the main building of Charles University is in Staré Město.

As of the end of 2004, 32,552 people lived in 18,821 homes in the district.

A Prague 1 address is considered quite prestigious, and real estate here is the most expensive in the city.

Government
The Czech Ministry of Transport is in Prague 1.

The Rail Safety Inspection Office has its head office in Prague 1.

The Ministry of Foreign Affairs of the Czech Republic is headquartered in Czernin Palace in Prague 1.

The Ministry of Education, Youth and Sports of the Czech Republic head office is in Prague 1.

See also
Districts of Prague#Symbols

References

External links

 Prague 1 official site 

 
Districts of Prague